Monsterz is a 2014 Japanese fantasy horror thriller film directed by Hideo Nakata. It is a remake of the 2010 South Korean film Haunters.

Cast
Tatsuya Fujiwara
Takayuki Yamada
Satomi Ishihara
Tae Kimura
Yutaka Matsushige
Mina Fujii

Reception
The film has grossed ¥697 million in Japan.

In Film Business Asia, Derek Elley gave the film a rating of 3 out of 10, calling it a "feeble Japanese remake" with "no atmosphere".

References

External links

2014 fantasy films
2014 horror thriller films
2014 horror films
Films directed by Hideo Nakata
Nippon TV films
Horror film remakes
Japanese remakes of South Korean films
Japanese fantasy films
Japanese horror films
Japanese thriller films
2014 films
Films scored by Kenji Kawai
2010s Japanese films
2010s Japanese-language films